West Indies Campaign may refer to:

Dutch West Indies campaign (1781–1782), a series of minor conflicts, in the Fourth Anglo-Dutch War and the Anglo-French War
West Indies Campaign (1793–1798), series of military contests mainly in the Caribbean spanning the French Revolutionary Wars
West Indies Campaign (1803–1810), series of military contests mainly in the Caribbean spanning the Napoleonic Wars

See also 
 East Indies campaign (disambiguation)
 West Indies Campaign Medal, a decoration of the U.S. Navy and Marine Corps, issued for service in the West Indies campaign (1898) of the Spanish–American War